Pavel Složil and Tomáš Šmíd were the defending champions, but lost in the semifinals to Broderick Dyke and Wally Masur.

Heinz Günthardt and Anders Järryd won the title by defeating Dyke and Masur 6–2, 6–1 in the final.

Seeds

Draw

Draw

References

External links
 Official results archive (ATP)
 Official results archive (ITF)

Milan Indoor
1985 Grand Prix (tennis)
Milan